Titanfall is a series of video games that mainly feature first-person shooter games. The series was created by Respawn Entertainment and debuted on Xbox and Microsoft Windows; it has expanded to other consoles and platforms.

Gameplay
In Titanfall, players control "Pilots" and their mech-style Titans, and fight in six-on-six matches set in the war-torn outer space colonies of the Frontier. The game is optimized for fast-paced, continual action, aided by wall-running abilities and populations of computer-controlled soldiers. Other titles in the series includes unique characters who are able to use special abilities.

Games

Main series

Titanfall 

Titanfall, the first game in the series, was released for Xbox One and Microsoft Windows on March 11, 2014. On April 8, 2014, it released for Xbox 360. The game was mainly multiplayer focused with no real single-player campaign included. Instead, there was a single-player tutorial included that served as a way for the player to learn the mechanics of the game.

Titanfall 2 

Titanfall 2 was released on October 28, 2016, for the Xbox One, PlayStation 4, and Microsoft Windows. This time, the game included a single-player campaign with a full-fledged story. Many of the mechanics from Titanfall returned, including maps in multiplayer. The game received several free updates after its launch, including a returning multiplayer mode known as Frontier Defense. The level "Effect and Cause" in particular was well received.

Spin-offs

Titanfall: Assault 

Titanfall: Assault was a top-down real-time strategy game for mobile platforms in the style of Clash Royale. It was developed by Particle City and Respawn Entertainment, published by Nexon, and released for iOS and Android in August 2017. All servers for Titanfall: Assault were shut down on July 30, 2018. On July 31, 2018, Titanfall: Assault was removed from Google Play shortly after the servers were shut down.

Apex Legends 

Apex Legends is a battle royale game that features hero shooter mechanics and the first major platform spin-off for the series. While the game is not directly tied to Titanfall, many of its assets and gameplay features were based on Titanfall 2. Although Apex Legends takes place in the Titanfall universe, the games do not run parallel to each other. The game was released in 2019 for the Xbox One, PlayStation 4, and Microsoft Windows, and in 2021 for Nintendo Switch as a free-to-play game. The game was met with positive critical reception. The game holds the record for the most players signed up in 1 week at 25 million. The game currently has a playerbase of 100 million people. The mobile game version called Apex Legends Mobile was released on May 17, 2022

Cancelled

Titanfall: Frontline 

Titanfall: Frontline was a collectible card game that was played in real-time. The player collects and places Pilot, Titan, and burn cards to damage and defeat their opponent. Pilot and Titan cards can combine to perform extra damage. In January 2017, Titanfall: Frontline was cancelled.

Titanfall Online 

In 2016, EA had announced that it was partnering with Nexon to create an Asian market specific version of Titanfall called Titanfall Online, similar to Counter-Strike Online and Call of Duty Online. This version was based on the first Titanfall rather than its sequel, with some slight differences like four main pilots in the game, the introduction of a new titan, and a new map. Titanfall Online had a closed beta in 2017. Titanfall Online was cancelled on July 9, 2018, primarily due to poor reception during testing and a changing market.

Unannounced Titanfall/Apex Legends single-player crossover 
On 2 February 2023, the supposed single-player Titanfall and Apex Legends game codenamed TFL (short for Titanfall Legends) has been cancelled even before the announcement.

Development

Titanfall is the first game developed by Respawn Entertainment, a developer founded by Jason West and Vince Zampella. As ex-employees of Infinity Ward, they helped create the Call of Duty franchise. The two were fired after contract disputes.

References

Electronic Arts franchises
Electronic Arts games
 
Video game franchises
Video game franchises introduced in 2014
Video games set on fictional planets
Spike Video Game Award winners
First-person shooters by series